Jack George Neil Taylor (January 31, 1931 – May 30, 1955) was an American competition swimmer and Olympic medalist.  At the 1952 Summer Olympics in Helsinki, Finland, as a 21-year-old, he received a bronze medal for his third-place finish in the event final of the men's 100-meter backstroke.

Taylor was born in Akron, Ohio.  He attended Ohio State University, where he swam for the Ohio State Buckeyes swimming and diving team in National Collegiate Athletic Association (NCAA) competition from 1950 to 1952.  He later became a naval aviator in the United States Navy; he died practicing aircraft carrier landings near Guantanamo Bay Naval Base, Cuba at the age of 24.

He is a member of Ohio State University's sports hall of fame.

See also
 List of Ohio State University people
 List of Olympic medalists in swimming (men)

References

1931 births
1955 deaths
American male backstroke swimmers
Ohio State Buckeyes men's swimmers
Olympic bronze medalists for the United States in swimming
Swimmers from Akron, Ohio
Swimmers at the 1952 Summer Olympics
United States Naval Aviators
Medalists at the 1952 Summer Olympics
United States Navy officers
Victims of aviation accidents or incidents in 1955
Victims of aviation accidents or incidents in Cuba
20th-century American people